Sirakoro is a village and rural commune in the Cercle of Kita in the Kayes Region of south-western Mali. The commune contains 10 villages and in the 2009 census had a population of 10,325.

Notable people
 

Moussa Léo Sidibé (b. 1949)

References

External links
.

Communes of Kayes Region